Die Brücke is a West German anti-war novel written by Gregor Dorfmeister, under the pseudonym of Manfred Gregor, and published in 1958 by Heyne Bücher. 

The book is an autobiographical account of forced youth service in the Volkssturm (people's army) late in Second World War. The protagonist left a no-win situation while six of his schoolmates stayed and were killed. The writer/protagonist suffered guilt and wrote the story.

External links 

1958 German novels
German historical novels
Novels set during World War II
Anti-war novels
German autobiographical novels
German novels adapted into films
German novels adapted into television shows
Works published under a pseudonym